KKAJ-FM is a radio station airing a country music format licensed to Davis, Oklahoma, broadcasting on 95.7 MHz FM. The station is owned by Stephens Media Group, through licensee SMG-Ardmore, LLC.

References

External links
KKAJ-FM's official website

Country radio stations in the United States
KAJ-FM